Carlos Alberto Gomes de Lima (born 15 July 1987), or simply Carlos Alberto, is a Brazilian professional footballer who plays as a striker.

External links
 
 
 Carlos Alberto at zerozero.pt 
 Carlos Alberto at gremio.net 

1987 births
Living people
Brazilian footballers
Brazilian expatriate footballers
Expatriate footballers in Lebanon
Brazilian expatriate sportspeople in Lebanon
Campeonato Brasileiro Série B players
Campeonato Brasileiro Série D players
Lebanese Premier League players
Association football forwards
Associação Desportiva Recreativa e Cultural Icasa players
Crato Esporte Clube players
Guarany Sporting Club players
S.C.U. Torreense players
São Bernardo Futebol Clube players
Sport Club São Paulo players
Sociedade Desportiva Juazeirense players
Sampaio Corrêa Futebol Clube players
Esporte Clube XV de Novembro (Piracicaba) players
Akhaa Ahli Aley FC players
Horizonte Futebol Clube players
Sportspeople from Belém
Caucaia Esporte Clube players